The 2017 Abu Kamal offensive, codenamed Operation Fajr-3 (translated Operation Dawn 3), was a military offensive launched by the Syrian Arab Army and its allies against members of the Islamic State of Iraq and the Levant (ISIL) in the Deir ez-Zor Governorate. The aim of the offensive was to capture ISIL's last urban stronghold in Syria, the border town of Abu Kamal. This offensive was a part of the larger Eastern Syria campaign.

The offensive took place at the same time as the Western Iraq campaign, which was aimed at recapturing the ISIL-held border town of Al-Qa'im and the rest of western Iraq.

Background

The offensive

Advance to the border 
On 23 October, government forces started an offensive to reach Abu Kamal; over the next 48 hours, 42 ISIL militants and 27 pro-government fighters were killed as ISIL attempted to halt the military's advance. By 25 October, ISIL managed to push government troops out of the town Al-Asharah, as well as parts of Al-Quriyah, along the western banks of the Euphrates river. Meanwhile, heavy fighting raged at the ISIL-held strategic T-2 Pumping Station in the southwestern countryside of Abu Kamal, with the Syrian Army and Hezbollah reportedly managing to surround the station on three sides. On 26 October, the Army and its allies captured the T-2 Pumping Station, after which they set up positions  from Abu Kamal. The government's advances were backed up by heavy Russian air-strikes.

On 27 October, as government forces were within  of Abu Kamal, ISIL was preparing the town's defenses. The next day, an ISIL counter-attack pushed back government troops in the area of the T-2 Station and the militants once again attacked the town of Al-Quriyah in the Euphrates river valley, seizing parts of it.

By 31 October, the ISIL attack against the T-2 Station was repelled and government forces were once again within  of Abu Kamal. The next day, six Russian Tu-22MZ long-range bombers that took off from air bases in Russia struck ISIL targets outside Abu Kamal. On 3 November, Iraqi security forces captured the Iraqi town of Al-Qa'im, on the opposite side of the border from Abu Kamal. Late that day, Iraqi paramilitary forces crossed the border from Al-Qa'im and attacked ISIL positions in the Hiri area on the outskirts of Abu Kamal, but were repelled back across the border by the following day. At the same time as the Iraqi cross-border attack, Russia reportedly conducted a massive air-strike on ISIL targets in a residential area of Abu Kamal. On 5 November, government forces pushed within  of Abu Kamal, reaching the Iraqi border.

First attack on the city 
After the Syrian Army met up with Iraqi militias on the border on 8 November, the Syrian military and its allies launched an assault on Abu Kamal, quickly encircling and entering the city. During the fighting, Hezbollah, which had hundreds of fighters take part in the battle, crossed into Iraq from where it then assaulted Abu Kamal along with the Iraqi PMF militias. The Syrian Army was also reported to have entered Iraq and then attacked Abu Kamal from Al-Qa'im. The entrance of both the Syrian Army and its allies into Iraq was reportedly with the permission of the Iraqi military. That evening, pro-government sources reported Abu Kamal had been captured, while the pro-opposition SOHR denied this and stated only parts of the town had been seized. The next day, SOHR confirmed the capture of Abu Kamal after ISIL forces withdrew from the city through a northern escape route they managed to maintain. Syrian Army High Command also officially declared the capture of Abu Kamal and issued a statement saying: ″The liberation of the city is of great importance since it represents an announcement of the fall of ISIS terrorist organization project in the region, in general, and a collapse of the illusions of its sponsors and supporters to divide it.″ The military subsequently started combing the city as part of demining operations. Meanwhile, pro-government forces continued their operations in the area and reportedly captured the Hamdan Military Airbase, north of Abu Kamal.

Late on 9 November, an ISIL counterattack recaptured 40 percent of Abu Kamal, including several neighborhoods in the northern, northeastern and northwestern part of the town. The next day, the fighting came close to the city center. Meanwhile, Hezbollah reported the leader of ISIL, Abu Bakr al-Baghdadi, was in Abu Kamal during the assault on the town. On 11 November, heavy airstrikes were being conducted against ISIL, in an effort by Syrian government forces to maintain their presence in the southern part of the city, and also to push ISIL fighters out of Abu Kamal. At this point it became apparent that the earlier ISIL retreat from Abu Kamal was conducted so to lure government troops into a trap which involved surprise attacks by militants hiding inside tunnels in the city center. The counter-assault involved suicide bombers and rocket attacks. The military and its allied militias suffered heavy casualties and by the end of the day ISIL managed to fully recapture the city, forcing pro-government forces to withdraw to one to two kilometers from the city. Meanwhile, the PMF was reported to had seized the nearby border crossing with Iraq.

Second attack on the city 
On 17 November, Syrian Army forces stormed the city again, capturing it by 19 November.

Fighting in the surrounding countryside continued until 6 December. During the fighting between 15 November and 3 December 447 fighters on both sides were killed. During this time, government forces advanced along the western bank of the Euphrates, so to besiege a pocket of ISIL territory southeast of Mayadin. The pocket was surrounded on 21 November, and in the following days the Army slowly cleared it. By 28 November, the pocket was eliminated and the town of Al-Quriyah was captured. The military then continued with its operations to link up forces advancing southeast of Mayadin with those at Abu Kamal. During the final push along the Euphrates, large numbers of ISIL suicide car bombers were sent against the advancing government forces, inflicting heavy casualties on the Army.

See also 

 2014 Eastern Syria offensive
 Battle of Mosul (2016–2017)
 Raqqa campaign (2016–2017)
 Central Syria campaign (2017)
 2017 Mayadin offensive

References 

Conflicts in 2017
Military operations of the Syrian civil war in 2017
Military operations of the Syrian civil war involving the Syrian government
Military operations of the Syrian civil war involving Russia
Military operations of the Syrian civil war involving the Islamic State of Iraq and the Levant
October 2017 events in Syria
November 2017 events in Syria
Deir ez-Zor Governorate in the Syrian civil war
Abu Kamal District